Gabriel Casagrande (born 12 November 1994) is a Brazilian racing driver. He competes full-time in the Stock Car Pro Series, driving the No. 83 Chevrolet Cruze for A. Mattheis Vogel Motorsport. He is a former champion of the Brazilian Stock Car championship, having won his first title in 2021.

Career

Stock Car Brazil
In 2013, Gabriel ran three stages in Stock Car Brasil for RC3 Bassani and the rest in the Turismo category, finishing in third place overall in the latter. In 2014, Casagrande raced with the C2 Team (formerly Gramacho), with driver Diego Nunes as his teammate. He was also paired with veteran Enrique Bernoldi in the first race of the season. In 2017, Casagrande went on to compete for the championship for Vogel Motorsport. He won his first career victory in the championship by winning the second race of the Curvelo round, in Minas Gerais. His second victory in the category came in 2019, when he won the first race of the eleventh round in Goiânia.

In 2021, Casagrande won the championship for the first time, winning two races in that season.

Racing record

Career summary

Complete Stock Car Brasil results
(key) (Races in bold indicate pole position) (Races in italics indicate fastest lap)

* Season still in progress.

References

External links
Gabriel Casagrande career details at driverdb.com

1995 births
Living people
People from Pato Branco
Brazilian racing drivers
Stock Car Brasil drivers
Sportspeople from Paraná (state)
Formula 3 Sudamericana drivers
Formula Renault Eurocup drivers
Formula Renault 2.0 NEC drivers
Formula Renault 2.0 Alps drivers
Mark Burdett Motorsport drivers
Hitech Grand Prix drivers
Brazilian WeatherTech SportsCar Championship drivers
WeatherTech SportsCar Championship drivers